Tarn-et-Garonne is a department in the Occitania region in Southern France. It is traversed by the rivers Tarn and Garonne, from which it takes its name. The area was originally part of the former provinces of Quercy and Languedoc. The department was created in 1808 under Napoleon, with territory taken from the neighbouring Lot, Haute-Garonne, Lot-et-Garonne, Gers and Aveyron departments.

The department is mostly rural with fertile agricultural land in the broad river valley, but there are hilly areas to the south, east and north. The departmental prefecture is Montauban; the sole subprefecture is Castelsarrasin. In 2019, it had a population of 260,669.

History

History of the region
Quercy was part of Aquitania prima under the Romans; Christianity was introduced during the 4th century. Early in the 6th century the area fell under the authority of the Franks, and in the 7th century became part of the autonomous Duchy of Aquitaine. At the end of the 10th century its rulers were the powerful counts of Toulouse. During the hostilities between England and France in the reign of Henry II of England, the English placed garrisons in the county, and by the 1259 Treaty of Paris lower Quercy came under the control of England.

The kings of both England and France around this time tried to curry favour by adding to the privileges of the towns and the district. In 1360, the Treaty of Brétigny was signed and the whole of Quercy passed to England. However, in the 1440s the English were finally expelled by the newly created army of Charles VII of France. In the 16th century Quercy was a stronghold of the Protestants, and the scene of fierce religious conflicts. The civil wars of the reign of Louis XIII largely took place around Montauban.

After Napoleon's defeat in 1815, the monarchy was re-established in France, but the discredited Bourbon Dynasty was overthrown in the July Revolution of 1830, which established the constitutional July Monarchy, which lasted until 1848. During this time the divide between the rich and poor increased; in Montauban, hundreds turned to begging as wages fell, factories closed and food prices rose; rioting was widespread and the home of the mayor was stoned by building workers in 1847.

History of the department

Before the department's formation in the nineteenth century, the northern half formed part of the old province of Quercy and the southern half, part of Languedoc. The department was created on 4 November 1808 during the First French Empire by a decision of Napoleon. The emperor had been invited to visit the town of Montauban, an important industrial and commercial centre at the time, whose populace thought the town was central enough and sufficiently important to be the capital of a new department. He was impressed by their loyalty and granted their request.

The department was formed out of territories that had previously been part of neighbouring areas. More than half of the territory was taken from the Department of Lot (including Montauban and Moissac), over one-third was taken from Haute-Garonne (including Castelsarrasin), and the rest from the departments of Lot-et-Garonne, Gers, and Aveyron. The first prefect was Félix Le Peletier d'Aunay, who was installed in his post on 31 December 1808.

Geography

Tarn-et-Garonne constitutes part of the Occitanie region in Southern France. It borders on the departments of Lot to the north, Aveyron to the northeast, Tarn to the east, Haute-Garonne to the south, and Gers and Lot-et-Garonne to the west. Montauban is situated on the right bank of the river Tarn at its confluence with the river Tescou, and the Tarn is joined by the Aveyron about  further downstream. The second largest commune in the department is Castelsarrasin which stands near the confluence of the Tarn and River Garonne. Montauban is connected to the Garonne via the  Canal de Montech.

The central part of the department is a broad river valley that does not exceed  in altitude, but near the commune of Valence-d'Agen, in the extreme west of the department, the valley narrows as the hilly regions of Bas-Quercy to the north and Lomagne to the south draw closer together. In the northeast of the department is higher land in the form of limestone plateaus known as the Causses, part of the Massif Central.

Demographics

Principal towns

The most populous commune is Montauban, the prefecture. As of 2019, there are 7 communes with more than 5,000 inhabitants:

Economy
The economy of the department depends mainly on agriculture but there is also some industry, and it benefits from its proximity to Toulouse. The commercial importance of Montauban is mainly due to its trade in agricultural products, horses, game and poultry, but it does have some manufacturing industries, which include cloth-weaving, cloth-dressing, flour-milling, wood-sawing, and the manufacture of furniture, silk-gauze and straw hats. The surrounding countryside supports  nursery-gardening, wine-making and the growing of maize, olives and mulberries. This area is approximately at the northern limit for the commercial production of the latter two crops because of the vagaries of the climate.

Politics

Departmental Council of Tarn-et-Garonne
The Departmental Council of Tarn-et-Garonne has 30 seats. The president of the Departmental Council is Michel Weill, elected in July 2021.

Members of the National Assembly
Tarn-et-Garonne elected the following members of the National Assembly during the 2022 legislative election:

Tourism

See also
 Cantons of the Tarn-et-Garonne department
 Communes of the Tarn-et-Garonne department
 Arrondissements of the Tarn-et-Garonne department

References

External links
  Prefecture of Tarn-et-Garonne website
  Departmental council of Tarn-et-Garonne website
  Arkheia History Review of Tarn-et-Garonne website

 
1808 establishments in France
Departments of Occitania (administrative region)
States and territories established in 1808